Maskis Laulja is an Estonian reality singing competition television series based on the Masked Singer franchise which originated from the South Korean version of the show King of Mask Singer. It premiered on TV3 on 15 March 2020.

Production

Format
A group of celebrities compete anonymously on stage, singing in full costumes over a series of episodes. Each episode, a portion of the competitors are paired off into face-off competitions, in which each will perform a song of his or her choice. From each face-off, the panelists and live audience vote: the winner's safe for the week, while the loser is put up for elimination. At the end of the episode, the losers of the face-offs are then subjected to new votes of the panelists to determine who will not continue; the eliminated singer then enters a special room backstage where it turns its back to the camera, takes off its mask, then turns around to reveal his/her identity.

In addition to the singing competition, hints to each masked singer's identity are offered during the show. Pre-taped interviews are given as hints and feature the celebrities' distorted voices. The panelists are given time to speculate the identity of the singer after the performance and ask them a single question to try and determine their identity.

Costumes and Costume Designers
The costumes of Season 1 and Season 2 were designed by Liisi Eesmaa and partly feature baltic and national motives such as Vanapagan, a devil-like creature from the Estonian mythology as well as Jonnipunni, an infant-like looking Doll that is one of the most-common-baby-articles of the countries or Kalevipoeg, the protagonist of National Epic. They are partly also used on the Latvian counterpart of the show.

The 10 costumes of Season 3 were designed by Grete Laus-Evestus  Liisi Eesmaa- dark artist Grete Laus-Evestus (Artist name Grete Stitch Laus) designed 5 costumes- Lumehelbeke (Snowflake), Ronk (Raven), Tort (Cake), Ööliblikas (Night Butterfly/ Moth) and Jänes (Rabbit). Liisi Eesmaa designed the other 5 costumes- Hirv (Deer), Ükssarvik (Unicorn), Kaheksajalg (Octopus), Sinine Ahv (Blue Monkey) and Malekuningas (Chess King).

Panelists and host

The panelists and host for season one were announced on 3 March 2020. It featured TV host Krista Lensin, journalist, radio host and actress Brigitte Susanne Hunt, fashion artist Ženja Fokin and comedian Mart Juur. For the second season, Fokin was replaced by Kristjan Jõekalda. Popular entertainer Mart Sander is presenting the show.

Series overview

Season 1
The first season was announced on 7 February 2020 and started airing on 15 March 2020 and concluded on 3 May 2020. It featured 10 celebrities from the field of entertainment, music, film and theatre, journalism and politics and was won by Stefan Airapetjan.

Celebrities

Episodes

Episode 1 (15 March)

Episode 2 (22 March)

Episode 3 (29 March)

Episode 4 (5 April)

Episode 5 (12 April)

Episode 6 (19 April)

Episode 7 (26 April)

Episode 8 - Finale (3 May)

Season 2
Season 2 was confirmed on 17 August 2020 and started to be tape in the same week. The first episode was aired on 18 October 2020. An additional programme called Maski taga (Behind the Mask) was launched that featured interviews with unmasked contestants and panelists as well as further speculations and theories about the main show.

Celebrities

Episodes

Episode 1 (18 October)

Episode 2 (25 October)

Episode 3 (1 November)

Episode 4 (8 November)

Episode 5 (15 November)

Episode 6 (22 November)

Episode 7 (29 November)
In this episode, the contestants performed duets with famous singers.

Episode 8 - Finale (6 December)

Season 3

Celebrities

Episodes

Episode 1 (13 March)

Episode 2 (20 March)

Episode 3 (27 March)

Episode 4 (3 April)

Episode 5 (10 April)

Episode 6 (17 April)

Episode 7 (24 April)

Episode 8 (8 May)

References

External links
 
 

2020 Estonian television series debuts
2020s Estonian television series
Masked Singer
21st-century Estonian television series
Estonian television series based on South Korean television series
TV3 (Estonia) original programming